Guilty? (French: Coupable?) is a 1951 French mystery film directed by Yvan Noé and starring Raymond Pellegrin, Junie Astor and André Le Gall. It was shot at the Victorine Studios in Nice. The film's sets were designed by the art director Emile Alex.

Cast
 Raymond Pellegrin as Noël Portal 
 Arlette Accart as Line Walter 
 Junie Astor as Suzanne 
 André Le Gall as Charles Walter
 Víctor Merenda as Le contremaître 
 Roger Monteaux as L'avocat 
 Charles Moulin as Joseph 
 Noël Darzal as Ernest - le barman 
 Marco Villa as Steve 
 Félix Clément
 Gustave Hamilton
 Jean-François Martial
 René Maupré
 Marcelle Pax
 Jacques Valois
 Irène Young

References

Bibliography 
 Goble, Alan. The Complete Index to Literary Sources in Film. Walter de Gruyter, 1999.

External links 
 

1951 films
1950s mystery films
French mystery films
1950s French-language films
Films directed by Yvan Noé
Films shot at Victorine Studios
French black-and-white films
1950s French films